Angela's Ashes: Music from the Motion Picture is the soundtrack, on the Sony Classical label, of the 1999 film starring Emily Watson and Robert Carlyle. The original score was composed by John Williams. The record was originally released on December 7, 1999.

The album was nominated for the Academy Award for Best Original Score (where it lost to the score of The Red Violin), and for the Golden Globe Award for Best Original Score (where it lost to the score of The Legend of 1900).

The US edition of the album, from Sony Classical, includes narration from the film, spoken by actor Andrew Bennett, over portions of almost every track. The European edition of the album, from Decca Records, features only Williams's score, without the narration.

Track listing
"Theme from "Angela's Ashes" – 6:18
"My Story" – 2:19
"Angela's Prayer" – 4:47
"My Dad's Stories" – 1:55
"Lord, Why Do You Want the Wee Children" – 4:03
"Plenty of Fish and Chips in Heaven" – 3:41
"The Dippsy Doodle" – 1:30
Performed by Nat Gonella & His Georgians
"The Lanes of Limerick" – 3:37
"My Dad" – 3:31
"Pennies from Heaven" – 2:11
Performed by Billie Holiday
"My Mother Begging" – 3:46
"If I Were in America" – 2:34
"Delivering Telegrams" – 2:23
"I Think of Teresa" – 1:50
"Angels Never Cough" – 2:38
"Watching the Eclipse" – 3:00
"Back to America" – 2:38
"End Credit Reprise" – 6:16

References

External links
Profile on tracksounds.com

1990s film soundtrack albums
John Williams soundtracks
1999 soundtrack albums
Sony Classical Records soundtracks